Le Veau d'Or is an Upper East Side of Manhattan restaurant open since 1937 making it through oldest French bistro in NYC. Riad Nasr and Lee Hanson of Frenchette are the owners, since April 2019. Catherine Treboux was the previous owner. Her father, Robert Treboux, bought the restaurant in 1985. In 1968, Craig Claiborne of The New York Times gave the restaurant a four-star review.

By 1980, their reputation had diminished. That year, The New York Times critic Moira Hodgson gave the restaurant a fair rating. On Anthony Bourdain: No Reservations, Bourdain was impressed with the breadth of their traditional menu. Catherine Treboux said appearing on the show helped their business.

History
The restaurant opened when many French chefs and restaurateurs were coming to New York to work at the French pavilion at the World's fair in Flushing, Queens who stayed in New York. Robert Treboux was one of those people.  Chefs who have worked in the restaurant include Daniel Boulud, Jean-Georges Vongerichten and David Bouley.

At the height of its popularity, customers included Marlene Dietrich, Oleg Cassini and Orson Welles.

Honors and awards
In 2011, they received the America's Classics Award from the James Beard Foundation.

References

External links
Anthony Bourdain’s Guide to Disappearing New York

James Beard Foundation Award winners
1937 establishments in New York City
French restaurants in New York City
Restaurants in Manhattan
Restaurants established in 1937
Upper East Side
Fine dining